Ludovic Mary (born 7 March 1977) is a French former professional footballer who played as a left-back.

References

External links
 
 Ludovic Mary profile at chamoisfc79.fr

1977 births
Living people
Sportspeople from Suresnes
French footballers
Association football defenders
FC Nantes players
Red Star F.C. players
Chamois Niortais F.C. players
US Colomiers Football players
Ligue 1 players
Ligue 2 players
Footballers from Hauts-de-Seine